Khadir or Khedir, is a district in Daykundi province, Afghanistan. It was created in 2005 from Daykundi district of the old Uruzgan province. Its capital Khadir is situated at 2,466 m elevation.

References 

Districts of Daykundi Province
Hazarajat